Barlind was a  cargo ship that was built in 1938 as Süderau by Deutsche Schiff- und Maschinenbau AG, Bremen, Germany for German owners. She was seized by the Allies in May 1945, passed to the Ministry of War Transport (MoWT) and was renamed Empire Content. In 1946, she was allocated to Norway and renamed Svartnes. She was sold into merchant service in 1947 and renamed Barlind. In 1971, she was sold to Greece and renamed Ikaria. She served until 1972 when she was scrapped.

Description
The ship was built as yard number 596 in 1938 by Deutsche Schiff- und Maschinenbau AG.

The ship had a GRT of 1,453 and a NRT of 713, with a DWT of 2,120.

The ship was propelled by a 4-stroke Single Cycle Single Acting diesel engine, which had 12 cylinders of  diameter by  stroke. The engines were built by Friedrich Krupp Germaniawerft AG, Kiel.

The engine was built by H C Stülcken Sohn.

The engine was built by Deutsche Schiff- und Maschinenbau AG. The engine drove the propeller via double reduction gearing and a hydraulic coupling.

History
Süderau was built for Bugsier Reederei und Bergungs AG, Hamburg. She was completed in January 1939. Her port of registry was Hamburg and she was allocated the Code Letters DJYQ.

In May 1945, Süderau was seized by the Allies at Bremerhaven. She was passed to the MoWT and renamed Empire Content. Her port of registry was changed to London. The Code Letters GJBK and United Kingdom Official Number 180645 were allocated. She was placed under the management of Gillespie & Nichol Ltd.

In 1946, Empire Content was transferred to the Norwegian Government and was renamed Svartnes. In 1947, she was sold to F Olsen & Co and was renamed Barlind. Her port of registry was Oslo and the Code Letters LLTV were allocated. She was sold in 1971 to L N Pothas, Greece and was renamed Ikaria, serving until she was scrapped in Aspropyrgos in the first quarter of 1972.

References

External links
Photo of Barlind 

1938 ships
Ships built in Bremen (state)
Steamships of Germany
Merchant ships of Germany
World War II merchant ships of Germany
Ministry of War Transport ships
Empire ships
Steamships of the United Kingdom
Merchant ships of the United Kingdom
Steamships of Norway
Merchant ships of Norway
Fred. Olsen & Co.
Steamships of Greece
Cargo ships of Greece